"Me and My Gang" is a song written by Jeffrey Steele, Jon Stone, and Tony Mullins and recorded by American country music group Rascal Flatts. It was released on April 17, 2006 as the second single and title track from the band's 2006 album of the same name. The song peaked at #6 on the U.S. Billboard Hot Country Songs chart that year.

Content
"Me and My Gang" is an up-tempo accompanied by electric guitar with a talk box in the intro. In it, the male narrator talks about traveling across the country with his gang.

Tony Mullins, one of the song's writers, said that he came up with the song's main riff while working on another song. Jeffrey Steele then heard the riff and decided that it seemed to fit a title, "Me and My Gang", that he had in his mind at the time. While working on recording the song, Rascal Flatts' lead singer Gary LeVox called Mullins and asked if the original line "dude named king kong eattin' on a ding dong" in the song could be changed. This line became "Dude named Elrod, jammin' on an iPod", which Mullins says was the first line that came to him.

Critical reception
Allmusic critic Stephen Thomas Erlewine, in reviewing the album, said that the song seemed like a simplification of Big & Rich's "swagger" and featured similar talk-box riffs to Bon Jovi's "Livin' on a Prayer".

Personnel
From Me and My Gang liner notes.
 Tom Bukovac - guitars
 Eric Darken - percussion
 Jay DeMarcus - bass guitar
 Dann Huff - guitars
 Charlie Judge - keyboards
 Gary LeVox - lead vocals
 Chris McHugh - drums
 Joe Don Rooney - guitars
 Jonathan Yudkin - fiddle, banjo

Charts

Year-end charts

References

2006 singles
2006 songs
Rascal Flatts songs
Songs written by Jeffrey Steele
Song recordings produced by Dann Huff
Lyric Street Records singles
Songs written by Tony Mullins